Santiago Véscovi Vannet (born 14 September 2001) is a Uruguayan college basketball player for the Tennessee Volunteers of the Southeastern Conference (SEC).

Early life and career
Born in Montevideo, Véscovi grew up playing basketball at the youth level for Club Atlético Bohemios. In July 2017, his performance at a Basketball Without Borders camp in The Bahamas helped him earn an invitation to the NBA Academy Latin America in Mexico City. At age 16, he began attending the academy, while receiving online education through the Apex Learning Virtual School. In July 2019, Véscovi moved to the NBA Global Academy, a training center at the Australian Institute of Sport in Canberra. That month, he led his team to the 2019 NBA Academy Games championship. Véscovi was named most valuable player of the 2019 Skill Factory Tournament of Champions after averaging 17.4 points per game. In September 2019, he averaged 12.5 points, 4.3 rebounds, three assists and 1.5 steals per game for the Uruguay Elite Team at the NBA G League International Challenge.

Recruiting
Véscovi was considered a four-star recruit by 247Sports and a three-star recruit by ESPN and Rivals. On 22 November 2019, he committed to playing college basketball for Tennessee. He planned on enrolling at the University of Tennessee during the second semester.

College career
Tennessee coach Rick Barnes said in December 2019 that it was "highly unlikely" that Véscovi would play in his freshman season, indicating that he would likely redshirt to learn the system. However, with the loss of Lamonte Turner to injury, there was an opening for Véscovi to start at point guard. He was cleared to play for the team on 3 January 2020. One day later, he made his college debut, scoring 18 points, shooting 6-of-9 from three-point range, in a 78–64 loss to LSU. He also posted six rebounds and four assists, while committing nine turnovers. On 11 February, he recorded a freshman season-high 20 points and eight assists in an 82–61 win over Arkansas. In a game at Auburn on 22 February, an Auburn fan was ejected and barred from future games after yelling a xenophobic taunt at Véscovi. He started in all 19 of his appearances as a freshman, averaging 10.7 points, 3.7 assists, 3.3 rebounds and 1.2 steals per game. As a sophomore, Véscovi averaged 8.7 points, 3.7 rebounds and 3.1 assists per game. As a junior, he averaged 13.3 points, 4.4 rebounds, 3.2 assists and 1.7 steals per game. Véscovi was named to the First Team All-SEC as a junior. On 26 March 2022, he declared for the 2022 NBA draft while maintaining his college eligibility.

National team career

Uruguayan junior national team
In October 2016, Véscovi averaged 21.8 points, six rebounds and 3.4 assists per game, leading Uruguay to fourth place at the FIBA South America Under-15 Championship in Asunción.

Uruguayan senior national team
Véscovi debuted for the Uruguayan senior national team at the 2019 Pan American Games in Lima.

Career statistics

College

|-
| style="text-align:left;"| 2019–20
| style="text-align:left;"| Tennessee
| 19 || 19 || 30.3 || .373 || .360 || .808 || 3.3 || 3.7 || 1.2 || .2 || 10.7
|-
| style="text-align:left;"| 2020–21
| style="text-align:left;"| Tennessee
| 27 || 23 || 29.2 || .388 || .373 || .816 || 3.7 || 3.1 || 1.2 || .0 || 8.7
|-
| style="text-align:left;"| 2021–22
| style="text-align:left;"| Tennessee
| 35 || 35 || 31.2 || .413 || .403 || .793 || 4.4 || 3.2 || 1.7 || .2 || 13.3
|- class="sortbottom"
| style="text-align:center;" colspan="2"| Career
| 81 || 77 || 30.3 || .397 || .386 || .803 || 3.9 || 3.3 || 1.4 || .1 || 11.2

Personal life
He is a Peñarol supporter. Véscovi's father, Pablo, played volleyball for Club Atlético Bohemios. His grandfather, Daniel Vannet, played basketball for Bohemios and for the Uruguayan national team. His mother is Laura Vannet and he has a sister, Lucia. Véscovi is of Italian descent.

References

External links
Tennessee Volunteers bio

2001 births
Living people
Point guards
Sportspeople from Montevideo
Tennessee Volunteers basketball players
Uruguayan expatriate basketball people in Mexico
Uruguayan expatriate basketball people in the United States
Uruguayan expatriate sportspeople in Australia
Uruguayan men's basketball players
Uruguayan people of Italian descent